Metta may refer to:

Buddhism
 Maitrī (aka mettā), a Buddhist concept of love and kindness
 Metta Institute, a Buddhist training institute
 Mettā Forest Monastery, Valley Center, California, USA; a Buddhist monastery

Other uses
 Metta (given name)
 FK Metta, Riga, Latvia; a soccer team

See also

 LaMetta Wynn (1933–2021), U.S. politician
 
 Meta (disambiguation)